Gare de Villedieu-les-Poêles is a railway station serving the town Villedieu-les-Poêles, Manche Department, Normandy, northwestern France.

Services

The station is served by regional trains to Argentan, Paris and Granville.

References

Railway stations in Manche
Railway stations in France opened in 1870